The Vogelstein Center for Drama and Film is the home to Vassar College's drama and film departments. Before its 2003 renovation, the building was known as Avery Hall, and before that, the Calisthenium and Riding Academy. It was originally designed by J.A. Wood. It has been adapted to many uses since its construction. A design by Cesar Pelli turned it into the Center for Drama and Film in 2003.

References 

Vassar College buildings
César Pelli buildings